Harold Arthur Armstrong (1885 – after 1911) was an English footballer who played as an outside right.

He signed for Sheffield Wednesday from his hometown club, Wearside League champions Southwick, in April 1907. He netted 13 goals for Wednesday's reserve when they won the Midland League in 1908, but made only six first-team appearances for the Owls. He moved on to West Ham United in 1909, but never made an appearance for the first team, and left for Darlington at the end of the season. He played six FA Cup matches for his new club, scoring once, and also scored once in the North-Eastern League, before moving back to the Wearside League with Silksworth Colliery Welfare.

References

1885 births
Year of death missing
English footballers
Footballers from Sunderland
Association football outside forwards
Southwick F.C. (Durham) players
Sheffield Wednesday F.C. players
West Ham United F.C. players
Darlington F.C. players
Silksworth Colliery Welfare F.C. players
English Football League players